Growth differentiation factor 1 (GDF1) is a protein that in humans is encoded by the GDF1 gene.

GDF1 belongs to the transforming growth factor beta superfamily that has a role in left-right patterning and mesoderm induction during embryonic development. It is found in the brain, spinal cord and peripheral nerves of embryos.

References

Further reading

Developmental genes and proteins
TGFβ domain